Louis, Dauphin of France (or of Viennois), or variations on this name, may refer to:

 Louis, Dauphin of France, Duke of Guyenne (1397–1415), third son of Charles VI of France, was Dauphin 1401–1415
 Louis, Grand Dauphin (1661–1711), son of Louis XIV of France, was Dauphin 1661–1711
 Louis, Dauphin of France, Duke of Burgundy (1682–1712), son of the previous, grandson of Louis XIV, known as Duke of Burgundy, was Dauphin 1711–1712
 Louis, Duke of Brittany (1707–1712), son of the previous, great-grandson of Louis XIV, known as Duke of Brittany, was Dauphin for one week in 1712
 Louis, Dauphin of France (1729–1765), son of Louis XV of France, was Dauphin 1729–1765
 Louis Joseph, Dauphin of France (1781–1789), eldest son of Louis XVI of France, was Dauphin 1781–1789

Several later Dauphins are considered pretenders to the throne of France:

 Louis XVII of France (1785–1795), younger son of Louis XVI of France and Marie Antoinette, who, though never having reigned is counted as King Louis XVII, was Dauphin 1789–1791
 Louis Antoine, Duke of Angoulême (1775–1844), best known as Duke of Angoulême and who is counted as King Louis XIX by legitimists, was Dauphin 1824–1830
 Louis Alphonse, Duke of Anjou (born 1974), the current legitimist Pretender to the defunct French throne as Louis XX, was known by his supporters as Louis, Dauphin of France from 1984 to 1989

A number of men named Louis who ascended the French throne and are much better known as kings:
 Louis XI of France (1423–1483) was Dauphin 1429–1461
 Louis XIII of France (1601–1643) was Dauphin 1601–1610
 Louis XIV of France (1638–1715) was Dauphin 1638–1643
 Louis XV of France (1710–1774) was Dauphin 1712–1715
 Louis XVI of France (1754–1793) was Dauphin 1765–1774

See also
Louis, Dauphin of Auvergne (disambiguation)